Kiril "Džina" Simonovski (Macedonian: Кирил Симоновски – Џина; or Кирил Симеонов; 19 October 1915 – 12 June 1984) was a Macedonian footballer. He played top league football for Gragjanski Skopje, Macedonia Skopje, FK Vardar and FK Partizan.

Playing career

Club
He started playing football in a local club in Skopje named FK Jug, before moving to Gragjanski Skopje in 1938. In 1941, during World War II and the Axis invasion of Yugoslavia, most of the region of the then Vardarska Banovina was occupied by the Bulgarian forces and in that period Gragjanski was renamed to Makedonija Skopie. The club finished in second place in the 1942 Bulgarian State Championship, and during this period Simonovski played two matches for the Bulgarian national team (as Kiril Simeonov). At the end of the war, Simonovski moved to Belgrade and signed with newly formed FK Partizan where he will play all the way until 1950, winning two national championships and one cup.

International
It was in this period that he became the first Macedonian to play for the post-1945 Yugoslav national team, having played a total of 10 matches and scored once.

Managerial career
After retiring he became a coach. He coached FK Partizan, FK Vardar and Olympiacos F.C. among several other clubs in Yugoslavia, Greece and Cyprus.

Personal life
His brother Blagoje also played for Bulgaria.

Honours
As player:
Partizan
Yugoslav First League: 1946–47, 1948–49
Yugoslav Cup: 1946–47

As coach:
Partizan
Yugoslav Cup: 1957

Olympiacos
Greek Cup: 1961

References

External links
 
Profile at the Football Association of Serbia website 
 Profile at the Football Association of Macedonia website

1915 births
1984 deaths
Footballers from Skopje
Association football fullbacks
Yugoslav footballers
Macedonian footballers
Bulgarian footballers
Yugoslavia international footballers
Bulgaria international footballers
Dual internationalists (football)
FK Partizan players
FK Vardar players
Yugoslav First League players
Yugoslav football managers
Macedonian football managers
FK Vardar managers
Aris Thessaloniki F.C. managers
FK Partizan managers
Olympiacos F.C. managers
Yugoslav expatriate football managers
Expatriate football managers in Greece
Yugoslav expatriate sportspeople in Greece